Donna Gilmore (born 20 August 1929) is a Canadian sprinter. She competed in the women's 200 metres at the 1948 Summer Olympics.

References

External links
 

1929 births
Living people
Athletes (track and field) at the 1948 Summer Olympics
Canadian female sprinters
Olympic track and field athletes of Canada
Athletes from Vancouver
Olympic female sprinters
20th-century Canadian women